A digital omnivore is a person who uses multiple modalities to access the Internet and other media content in their daily life. As people increasingly own mobile devices, cross-platform multimedia consumption has continued to shape the digital landscape, both in terms of the type of media content they consume and how they consume it.

As of 2021, at least half of all global digital traffic is generated by mobile devices.

A 2011 analysis of the way consumers in the U.S. viewed news content on different devices throughout the day demonstrates how people use different devices for different functions. On a typical weekend morning, digital omnivores accessed their news using their tablet, favored their computer during the working day, and returned to tablet use in the evening, peaking between the hours of 9pm and midnight. Mobile phones were used for web-browsing throughout the day when users were away from their personal computer.

The impact of connected devices on digital consumption

Increased Wi-Fi availability and mobile broadband adoption have changed the way people are going online. "In August 2011, more than a third (37.2%) of U.S. digital traffic coming from mobile phones occurred via a Wi-Fi connection while tablets, which traditionally required a Wi-Fi connection to access the Internet, are increasingly driving traffic using mobile broadband access." As of 2021, LTE, 5G, and other forms of mobile broadband access are available on the majority of mobile devices, while laptops still usually require a Wi-Fi connection.

Tablet owners
Tablets contributed nearly 2% of all web browsing traffic in the United States in 2011. This traffic was driven almost exclusively by the iPad, which accounted for more than 97% of all tablet traffic in the second half of 2011. During this period, iPads also began to account for a higher share of Internet traffic than iPhones (46.8% vs. 42.6% of all iOS device traffic.

Implications for marketing, advertisers and publishers
As of 2021, the average amount of time spent daily consuming digital media is eight hours, an increase from 2020 and a further increase from 2019, partially as a result of the COVID-19 pandemic. Social media platforms such as Instagram, Facebook, Twitter, and TikTok, as well as other online platforms like YouTube, incorporate advertisements into the in-app or online experience, with some offering the ability to shop for and sell items through the app or website.

See also

 Ubiquitous computing
 Ambient intelligence
 Mobile interaction
 Pervasive game
 Wearable computer
 Internet of Things
 Mobile marketing
 New media
 Social media
 Participatory media
 Consumer-generated media
 Integrated marketing communications
 Mobile cloud computing
 Cloud computing
 Digital addict
 Digital detox
 Digital phobic
 Internet marketing
 Social-media marketing
 Marketing communications

References

Mobile marketing
Digital media
 
Citizen media
Collective intelligence
Cloud computing